Talib Rasul Hakim was an American composer. Born Stephen Alexander Chambers on February 8, 1940, brother to noted jazz drummer and composer Joe Chambers in Asheville, North Carolina, he grew up playing music in school, studying clarinet, piano, and singing in church choir. He later studied music at the Manhattan School of Music, New York College of Music, and the New School for Social Research, New York. His teachers include Morton Feldman, Ornette Coleman, Margaret Bonds, Robert Starer, Hall Overton, Chou Wen-Chung, William Sydeman, Hale Smith, and Charles Whittenberg.

Hakim first came to attention in the wider music community through appearances of his works on the "Music in Our Time" concert series in New York in the mid-1960s. He received awards and residencies from the Bennington Composers Conference (1964–90) and the Connecticut Commission on the Arts (1981–2), as well as ASCAP, grants from the National Endowment for the Arts, and the Creative Artist Public Service Program. In addition to composing, Hakim taught at Pace College, Adelphi University, Nassau Community College, and Morgan State University, as well as working as a radio and television producer.

After converting to Sufism in 1973, Hakim changed his name. He died on March 31, 1988, in New Haven, Connecticut.

List of works
* Indicates extant score materials located in College Archives & Special Collections at Columbia College Chicago

Mutations (1964)* bass clarinet, horn, trumpet, viola, cello

Six Players and Voice (1964)* Soprano, clarinet, trumpet, cello, 2 percussion, and piano

Four (1965)* Clarinet, trumpet, trombone, piano

Piano Piece (1965) Piano

Shapes (1965)* Chamber Orchestra

Three Play Short Five (1965)* Bass clarinet, percussion, bass

Contours (1966)* Oboe, Bassoon, horn, trumpet, cello, bass

Currents (1967)* String Quartet

Elements (1967) Flute/alto flute, clarinet/bass clarinet, violin/viola, cello, piano, glass and bamboo wind and hand chimes

Roots and Other Things (1967) Flute/alto flute, oboe/EH, clarinet/bass clarinet, trumpet, horn, trombone, viola, cello, bass

Sound-Gone (1967) Piano

Inner-Sections (1967) Flute, clarinet, trombone, piano, percussion

Sound Images (1969) Brass, 3 percussion, strings, female chorus

Tone-Poem (1969)* Soprano, percussion, contrabass, and piano (text by Langston Hughes)

Placements (1970)* Piano, percussion

Set-Three (1970) Soprano, cello, piano

Timelessness (1970) Flugelhorn, horn, trombone, tuba, 2 percussion, bass, and piano

Uranian-Projections (1970) Soprano, percussion, and piano

Visions of Ishwara (1970)* Orchestra

Reflections on the 5th Day (1972) Narrator, chamber orchestra

Concepts (1974)* Orchestra

Recurrences (1974)* Orchestra

Arkan- 5 (1980–81)* Chamber Orchestra

Lailatu'l-Qadr (The Night of Power) (1984) Bass clarinet, bass, percussion

Az-Zaahir-Al Batin(The Outward-The Inward) (1985–86)* Orchestra

Notes

References
Horne, Aaron. Keyboard Music of Black Composers: A Bibliography. Westport, Connecticut: Greenwood, 1992.

Horne, Aaron. String Music of Black Composers: A Bibliography. Westport, Connecticut: Greenwood, 1992.

1940 births
1988 deaths
Converts to Islam
American Muslims
American male composers
Steinhardt School of Culture, Education, and Human Development alumni
New York College of Music alumni
American Sufis
The New School alumni
20th-century American composers
20th-century American male musicians